The Nuestra Belleza Paraguay 2015 pageant was held on September 21, 2015. Sally Jara, Miss Universo Paraguay 2014, crowned her successor Laura Garcete at the end of the event; she was the Paraguayan candidate for the 2015 Miss Universe pageant. Elected to represent Paraguay at Miss World 2015 was Giovanna Cordeiro, for Miss International 2015 was Mónica Mariani, and for Miss Earth 2015 was Myriam Arévalos. The pageant was not broadcast live for the first time in a long time.

Results

*Laura Garcete, was dethroned as the winner as a result of her pregnancy. Myriam Arévalos was appointed by the organization to compete at Miss Universe 2015.

Judges
The following persons judged the final competition.
Federico Duarte Macchi
María José Maldonado
Mariela Candia
Darío Jara 
and some sponsors directors

See also
Miss Paraguay

References

External links
Miss Universo Paraguay Official Website.
Promociones Gloria.
MissParaguay.org.

2015
2015 beauty pageants
2015 in Paraguay
September 2015 events in South America